Sunnyclist is the name of a series of car prototypes created by Enermech (formerly Energomichaniki Kritis), a Herakleion, Crete-based company involved in Green energy projects. Introduced in September 2013, the first model utilized various combinations of solar, electric, and human powers. The vehicle has been presented in a series of Greek and European exhibitions; it is a three-seater, features a light aluminum frame and a sun-tracking solar panel on the roof, and has a maximum speed of 50 km/h.

In October 2015, an improved version was presented, which has not been produced to date. In February 2022 a four-wheel design was introduced, intended for production, while the company also introduced a three-wheel solar powered bicycle.

External links
Company website
Sunnyclist in Dutch auto catalog
Sunnyclist introduction
Report about Sunnyclist award 
Sunnyclist in European Venture Summit
Sunnyclist four-wheel design

References
L.S. Skartsis, "Greek Vehicle & Machine Manufacturers 1800 to present: A Pictorial History", Bookstars, Athens (2013) 

Car manufacturers of Greece
Solar-powered vehicles
Hybrid electric vehicles